Joanne O'Callaghan born 1983 in Cork is a camogie player and pharmacy representative, winner of All Ireland medals in 2002, 2005, 2006, 2008 , 2009 and 2014. She captained Cork to the All-Ireland title in 2006 and is in her 13th season on the Senior team. She also has Minor and Intermediate All-Ireland championship medals to her credit as well as Ashbourne Cup and Gael Linn honours. She holds three county Senior championship medals with her club, Cloughduv.

References

External links 
Official Camogie Website
  "Denise Cronin's championship diary in On The Ball Official Camogie Magazine"
 https://web.archive.org/web/20091228032101/http://www.rte.ie/sport/gaa/championship/gaa_fixtures_camogie_oduffycup.html Fixtures and results] for the 2009 O'Duffy Cup
 All-Ireland Senior Camogie Championship: Roll of Honour
 Video highlights of 2009 championship Part One and part two
 Video Highlights of 2009 All Ireland Senior Final
 Report of All Ireland final in  Irish Times Independent and Examiner

1983 births
Living people
Cork camogie players